Dierks School District  is based in Dierks, Arkansas, United States. The district serves more than 575 students in prekindergarten through twelfth grade and employs more than 100 educators and staff.

The school district encompasses  of land in Howard County, Pike County, and Sevier County and serves all or portions of Dierks, Lockesburg, Newhope, Kirby, Langley, and Nashville.

Schools 
 Dierks High School, serving grades 7 through 12.
 JoAnn Walters Elementary School, serving prekindergarten through grade 12.

References

External links
 

School districts in Arkansas
Education in Howard County, Arkansas
Education in Pike County, Arkansas
Education in Sevier County, Arkansas